Adolphe Marcoux (October 29, 1884 – September 10, 1951) was a physician and a nationalist politician in Quebec, Canada.

Born in Beauport, Quebec, Marcoux won a seat to the Legislative Assembly of Quebec as a Union Nationale candidate in the 1936 election in the district of Québec-Comté. In 1937, he and colleagues René Chaloult, Oscar Drouin, Joseph-Ernest Grégoire and Philippe Hamel left the Union Nationale.  Marcoux did not run for re-election in the 1939 election.

References

1884 births
1951 deaths
Politicians from Quebec City
Union Nationale (Quebec) MNAs